Sir Percy James Grigg, KCB, KCSI, PC (16 December 18905 May 1964), better known as Sir James Grigg, was a British civil servant who was unexpectedly moved, at the behest of then-Prime Minister Winston Churchill, from being the Permanent Under-Secretary of State at the War Office to become Secretary of State for War, the political head of the same department during the Second World War.

Background and education
The son of Frank Alfred Grigg, a carpenter, James Grigg was born in Exmouth and won a scholarship to Bournemouth School and St John's College, Cambridge where he studied mathematics, achieving first-class honours in both parts of his tripos.

Career in civil service
Grigg came first in the civil service examination in 1913, and commenced work at the Treasury. During the First World War he served in the Royal Garrison Artillery. After the war he returned to the Treasury, becoming Principal Private Secretary to the Chancellor of the Exchequer in 1921. He held this post until 1930, serving several successive Chancellors including Winston Churchill. Grigg then became Chairman of the Board of Customs and Excise and Chairman of the Board of Inland Revenue. In 1934, he was transferred to New Delhi, India where he became Finance Member of the Government of India in anticipation of limited self-rule that began in 1935. He remained in New Delhi until 1939, and afterward continued to influence British imperial policies on India, especially after his patron Winston Churchill became Prime Minister. Grigg became Permanent Under-Secretary of State for War in 1939; he oversaw a turbulent department, which in 1940 witnessed no fewer than four different Secretaries of State (Leslie Hore-Belisha, Oliver Stanley, Anthony Eden and David Margesson).

Secretary of State for War
Grigg proved an effective departmental head, but it came as a great shock to many when in February 1942 Churchill dismissed Margesson and replaced him with Grigg – who had to convey the news to Margesson himself.  Amongst the many Ministerial appointments made by Churchill from outside the sphere of Westminster politics, this was seen as one of the most unusual, but was a response to considerable military setbacks such as the fall of Singapore, and the need to appease critics by replacing some ministers. Grigg retained his post for the rest of the war, holding it also in Churchill's 1945 "Caretaker Government". In 1942 he was elected as Member of Parliament (MP) for Cardiff East, beating Fenner Brockway. Alan Brooke the wartime Army CIGS said that with PJ he had the "best and most valuable advice on any matter I discussed with him" (unlike Lawson, who replaced Grigg). 

But in the 1945 general election Grigg lost his seat, and retired from public life.

Later life
In his later years Grigg held many directorships, including those of the Imperial Tobacco Company, the Prudential Assurance Company, the National Provincial Bank and the Distillers Company. In 1946, he became the first British executive director of the International Bank for Reconstruction and Development. He died on 5 May 1964, aged 73.

Family
He married Gertrude Charlotte Hough, daughter of the Reverend George Frederick Hough, in July 1919. The marriage was childless.

Memoir
Grigg, James. Prejudice and Judgment. Jonathan Cape, 1948.

References

External links
 
 

1890 births
1964 deaths
Alumni of St John's College, Cambridge
British Army personnel of World War I
Chairmen of the Board of HM Customs and Excise
Chairmen of the Board of Inland Revenue
Civil servants in HM Treasury
Conservative Party (UK) MPs for Welsh constituencies
Knights Commander of the Order of the Bath
Knights Commander of the Order of the Star of India
Members of the Parliament of the United Kingdom for Cardiff constituencies
Members of the Privy Council of the United Kingdom
Ministers in the Churchill caretaker government, 1945
Ministers in the Churchill wartime government, 1940–1945
People educated at Bournemouth School
People from Exmouth
Permanent Under-Secretaries of State for War
Private secretaries in the British Civil Service
Royal Artillery officers
Secretaries of State for War (UK)
UK MPs 1935–1945
War Office personnel in World War II
Military personnel from Devon
Members of the Council of the Governor General of India